South Louth was a parliamentary constituency in Ireland, which returned one Member of Parliament (MP) to the House of Commons of the Parliament of the United Kingdom, elected on a system of first-past-the-post, from 1885 to 1918. Prior to the 1885 general election and after the dissolution of Parliament in 1918 the area was part of the Louth constituency.

Boundaries
This constituency comprised the southern part of County Louth including the towns of Drogheda and Ardee. The seat was defined under the Redistribution of Seats Act 1885 as comprising the baronies of Drogheda and Ferrard, that part of the barony of Ardee not contained within the constituency of North Louth, and the county of the town of Drogheda.

Members of Parliament

Elections
The elections in this constituency took place using the first past the post electoral system.

Elections in the 1880s

Elections in the 1890s

Ambrose's death causes a by-election.

Elections in the 1900s

Elections in the 1910s

References

Debrett's Guide to the House of Commons and Judicial Bench, 1918

Westminster constituencies in County Louth (historic)
Constituencies of the Parliament of the United Kingdom established in 1885
Constituencies of the Parliament of the United Kingdom disestablished in 1918
Drogheda